Griffin–Floyd Hall (originally known as Floyd Hall) is a historic academic building located on the northeastern portion of the University of Florida campus in Gainesville, Florida. On June 27, 1979, it was added to the U.S. National Register of Historic Places. It currently houses the Department of Philosophy and Department of Statistics.

Namesake
Griffin–Floyd Hall is named for Major Wilbur Leonidas Floyd, one of three graduate students to receive the first master's degrees ever awarded by the University of Florida, and assistant dean of the College of Agriculture from 1915 to 1938, and for Ben Hill Griffin, Jr., an alumnus of the college and a successful agricultural businessman.

Early use
Built in 1912, the building was originally used in part to house animal husbandry faculty. Located near the university's dairy, the first floor once held a cattle judging arena. The second floor housed a chapel for daily religious exercise.

See also
History of the University of Florida
List of University of Florida buildings
University of Florida Campus Historic District

References

External links
Alachua County listings at National Register of Historic Places
Alachua County listings at Florida's Office of Cultural and Historical Programs
Virtual tour of University of Florida Campus Historic District at Alachua County's Department of Growth Management
The University of Florida Historic Campus at UF Facilities Planning & Construction
George A. Smathers Libraries
UF Builds: The Architecture of the University of Florida
Floyd Hall

Buildings at the University of Florida
National Register of Historic Places in Gainesville, Florida
William Augustus Edwards buildings
Historic American Buildings Survey in Florida
University and college buildings on the National Register of Historic Places in Florida
University and college buildings completed in 1912
1912 establishments in Florida